{{Automatic taxobox
|image =Tropideres albirostris 02.JPG
|image_caption =Tropideres albirostris|taxon = Tropideres
|authority = Schönherr, 1823
|subdivision_ranks = Species
|subdivision =
}}Tropideres''' is a genus of insects belonging to the family Anthribidae.

The genus was first described by Carl Johan Schönherr in 1823.

The genus has cosmopolitan distribution.

Species:
 Tropideres acerbus Boheman, 1833
 Tropideres dorsalis''

References

Anthribidae
Weevil genera